The England Under 20 rugby team are the newest representative rugby union team from England. They replace the two former age grade teams Under 19s and Under 21s. They compete in the annual Six Nations Under 20s Championship and World Rugby Under 20 Championship.

The head coach of the team is, Alan Dickens.

World Rugby Under 20 Championship

Their first tournament was the 2008 IRB Junior World Championship, in which they took second place, being defeated by New Zealand 3–38 in the final. The following year saw England finish runners up to New Zealand again at the 2009 IRB Junior World Championship. 

At the 2010 IRB Junior World Championship, they reached the Semi-finals after winning all of their pool stage games against Argentina, Ireland and France. They lost the semi-final to Australia 16–28 and then lost against South Africa 22–27 to finish in 4th place. England finished runners up to New Zealand again at the 2011 IRB Junior World Championship.

At the 2013 IRB Junior World Championship, England defeated New Zealand 33-21 in the semi final. In the final against Wales, tries from Jack Nowell and Sam Hill saw England recover from a dozen point half-time deficit to become World Champions at junior level for the first time.

England retained their title at the 2014 IRB Junior World Championship, defeating South Africa in the final. The following year saw England lose in the final of the 2015 World Rugby Under 20 Championship to New Zealand. England hosted the 2016 World Rugby Under 20 Championship. They regained the title after defeating Ireland in the final.

England were runners up to both New Zealand at the 2017 tournament and hosts France at the 2018 World Rugby Under 20 Championship.

Championship record

Overall

All results, up to and including the 2020 Six Nations Under 20s Championship and the 2019 World Rugby Under 20 Championship.

Current squad
England Under-20s elite squad for the 2020 Six Nations Under 20s Championship.

Management
Coaching Team:
Steve Bates (head coach)
Mark Hopley (forwards coach)
James Scaysbrook (defence coach)
Richard Whiffin (attack coach)

Honours

 Under-20 Rugby World Cup
Winners (3): 2013, 2014, 2016
Runners-up (6): 2008, 2009, 2011, 2015, 2017, 2018

 Under-20 Six Nations
Winners (7): 2008, 2011, 2012, 2013, 2015, 2017, 2021
Grand Slam (4): 2008, 2011, 2017, 2021
Triple Crown (6): 2008, 2011, 2012, 2014, 2017, 2021

See also
 England national rugby union team
 England women's national rugby union team
 England national rugby sevens team
 England Saxons

References

External links
 

European national under-20 rugby union teams
Rugby union